Nathan "Nate" Johnson (born October 3, 1976) is an American sprint canoer who competed in the mid-2000s. At the 2004 Summer Olympics in Athens, he was eliminated in the semifinals of both the C-2 500 m and C-2 1000 m events.

References

External links
Sports-Reference.com profile

1976 births
American male canoeists
Canoeists at the 2004 Summer Olympics
Living people
Olympic canoeists of the United States
Pan American Games medalists in canoeing
Pan American Games silver medalists for Canada
Medalists at the 1999 Pan American Games
Canoeists at the 1999 Pan American Games